João Carlos Daniel Filho (born 30 September 1937), best known as Daniel Filho, is a Brazilian film producer, director, actor, and screenwriter. He starred in the film Os Cafajestes, which was entered into the 12th Berlin International Film Festival.

Selected filmography
Actor

Director
 A Cama ao Alcance de Todos (1969)
 Believe It or Not (1969)

 Pobre Príncipe Encantado (1969)
 O Casal (1975)
 O Cangaceiro Trapalhão (1983)
 The Inheritance (2001)
 Owner of the Story (2004)
 Lots of Ice and a Little Bit of Water (2006)
 If I Were You (2006)
 Cousin Bazilio (2007)
 If I Were You 2 (2008)
 Peacetime (2009)
 Chico Xavier (2010)
 As Cariocas (2010)
 Confissões de Adolescente (2013)
Sorria, Você Está Sendo Filmado (2014)
Boca de Ouro (2019)
The Silence Of the Rain (2020)

Producer
 Orfeu (1999)
 A PArtilha (2001)Cazuza – O Tempo Não Pára (2004)
A Dona da História (2004)
Muito Gelo e Dois Dedos D'água (2006)
Se Eu Fosse Você (2006)
Cousin Basilio (2007) 
Times Of Peace (2009)
Se Eu Fosse Você 2 (2009)
 Connor Mcnaboe - Kiss me (2010)
Chico Xavier - O Filme (2010)
Confissões de Adolescente (2013)
Sorria, Você Está Sendo Filmado (2014)
É Fada (2016)
Sai de baixo - O Filme (2019)Boca de Ouro (2019)''
The Silence Of The Rain (2020)
Executive Order (2020)

References

External links

1937 births
Living people
People from Rio de Janeiro (city)
Brazilian film producers
Brazilian film directors
Brazilian male film actors
Brazilian screenwriters